Buchozia is a genus of extinct minute sea snails, marine gastropod mollusks or micromollusks in the family Mangeliidae.

Species
Species within the genus Buchozia include:
 † Buchozia angulifera de Boury, 1899
Species brought into synonymy
 † Buchozia perminuta Cossmann, 1923: synonym of † Fusulculus perminutus (Cossmann, 1923)  (original combination)

References

Révision des pleurotomes éocènes du Bassin de Paris (suite). La Feuille des Jeunes Naturalistes (3)29, n° 340: 62-65

External links
 MNHN, Paris: holotype of Buchozia angulifera